Tuscarora Township may refer to:

Canada 
 Tuscarora Township, Ontario

United States 
 Tuscarora Township, Cheboygan County, Michigan
 Tuscarora Township, Pierce County, North Dakota, in Pierce County, North Dakota
 Tuscarora Township, Perry County, Pennsylvania
 Tuscarora Township, Juniata County, Pennsylvania
 Tuscarora Township, Bradford County, Pennsylvania

See also
Tuscarora (disambiguation)

Township name disambiguation pages